Alkhis was a ruler of the area of Zabul, with its capital at Gazan (Ghazni) in Afghanistan in the early decades of the 8th century CE. He was the son of Khuras. He expanded his territory as far north of the region of Band-e Amir, west of Bamiyan. Although not listed in contemporary Chinese sources, Alkhis may have been a member of the Zunbil ruler of Zabulistan, and was probably of the same ethnicity as the nearby Turk Shahis ruling in Kabul at that time.

Alkhis is known to have sent a message to the Tang Dynasty Emperor in 724 CE. Before 726 CE, he made the territory of Zabul independent from the kingdom of Jibin-Kabul ruled by the Turk Shahis.

Alkhis is considered as the patron of the second period of florescence of the Buddhist sanctuary of Tapa Sardar, characterized in this period by the creation of hybrid Sinicized-Indian Buddhist art. 

The Bactrian inscription of the stupa at Tang-i Safedak, dated to around 715/716 CE or 710/724 CE, mentions the dedication of a stupa by Alkhis:

External links
 Two coins excavated at Tang-i Safedak

References

Turkic dynasties
Dynasties of Afghanistan